Jabab Kinte Chai (alternative spelling– Jobab KInte Chai) is a Bengali television quiz show. This show is aired on Sananda TV and hosted by Mir Afsar Ali. The planner and the mastermind of this show is quiz master Siddharth Basu.

Format 
Inspired by the British game show Sell Me the Answer it is basically a quiz show with a mix of bargaining. If a contestant does not know answer of a question, (s)he can buy the answer of the question from traders who are there to play for the contestant as well as against the contestant. The role of a trader is to help a contestant to win the maximum cash, but on the other hand, the trader also targets his own money. So, he could also completely mislead a player by giving the wrong answer. In an interview, Mir, the anchor of the quiz show told– "On moral grounds, it's a little sticky because the one who you think is helping you could actually completely trick you and make you give the wrong answer."

See also
 Mirakkel

References

External links 

Bengali-language television programming in India
Indian reality television series
Indian game shows